Rollo Congregational United Church of Christ is a Congregational church at 2471 Weddell Street in Rollo, Illinois. Rollo's Congregational church was founded in 1865; it originally met in a wooden church in rural Paw Paw Township and moved to Rollo in 1886. The present church building was built in 1913 after a storm damaged the previous church. Built by Andrew Svihus of nearby Shabbona, the church has a vernacular side steeple plan with Romanesque Revival details. Its design includes a brick exterior marked by pilasters and corbelling, a cross-gabled roof with a front-facing gable, a smaller gable above the front entrance, and a bell tower at the southeast corner.

The church was added to the National Register of Historic Places on August 27, 2019.

References

External links
Church website

National Register of Historic Places in DeKalb County, Illinois
Churches on the National Register of Historic Places in Illinois
Romanesque Revival church buildings in Illinois
Churches completed in 1913
Congregational churches in Illinois